Homewood Canyon is a census-designated place (CDP) in Inyo County, California. The 2010 United States census reported Homewood Canyon's population was 44.

Prior to the 2010 census, the former CDP of Homewood Canyon-Valley Wells was split into Homewood Canyon and Valley Wells.

Demographics

The 2010 United States Census reported that Homewood Canyon had a population of 44. The racial makeup of Homewood Canyon was 37 (84.1%) White, five (11.4%) from other races, and two (4.5%) from two or more races. There were six (13.6%) Hispanic or Latino people of any race.

The Census reported that 44 people (100% of the population) lived in households.

There were 24 households, out of which two (8.3%) had children under the age of 18 living in them and 10 (41.7%) were opposite-sex married couples living together. There was one (4.2%) unmarried opposite-sex partnership. 11 households (45.8%) were made up of individuals, and four (16.7%) had someone living alone who was 65 years of age or older. The average household size was 1.83.  There were 10 families (41.7% of all households); the average family size was 2.60.

The population was spread out, with four people (9.1%) under the age of 18, two people (4.5%) aged 18 to 24, four people (9.1%) aged 25 to 44, 24 people (54.5%) aged 45 to 64, and 10 people (22.7%) who were 65 years of age or older.  The median age was 56.0 years. For every 100 females, there were 144.4 males.  For every 100 females age 18 and over, there were 150.0 males.

The vacancy rate was 0%. 40 people (90.9% of the population) lived in owner-occupied housing units and 4 people (9.1%) lived in rental housing units.

References

Census-designated places in Inyo County, California
Census-designated places in California